Lee Chang-yang (李昌洋, born 1962) is a South Korean professor of public policy at KAIST who served as Minister of Trade, Industry and Energy under the Yoon Suk-yeol government.

References 

1962 births
Living people
People from South Gyeongsang Province
Seoul National University alumni
Harvard Kennedy School alumni
Academic staff of KAIST
Trade ministers of South Korea